Ilary Blasi (born 28 April 1981) is an Italian showgirl, model, television personality, and former child actress.

Early life
Ilary was born in Rome, daughter of Roberto and Daniela. Her mother named her after one of her favourite Western movie heroines. Blasi has two sisters, Melory and Silvia. Blasi was introduced to showbusiness by her mother. As she declared in an interview, a neighbour told her mother that an agency was recruiting a blonde child with blue eyes for an advertisement of the "Panettone Galbusera"; Daniela brought Blasi to the casting, and she was selected for her first job.

Career

Early career

She joined showbusiness very early: at the age of 3 Blasi shot her first TV ads, at 5 she debuted in the cinema with a little role in the movie "David & David" directed by Giorgio Capitani, while at 6 she was in the cast of "Da grande" of Franco Amurri (in this movie her name appeared in the final credits with the English distortion "Hilary Blasi") and "Vizio di vivere" by Dino Risi. Later she was in the movie "Fiori di zucca" (1988) by Stefano Pomilia and "La dolce casa degli orrori" (1989) by Lucio Fulci. In that period she did testimonials for various advertisers, like the one for the oil "Cuore" with her whole family, "Cicciobello" doll, "Renault" cars and "Barilla Group", "Galbusera", "Findus", "Balocco" and "Sanson" (food).

In search of success

At the end of the 1990s Blasi tried different approaches to get back into show business; she worked as a model for the photo stories done by the "Lancio" publishing house, she posed nude for a few photoshoots and walked the runways for some of the fashion agencies in Rome, she joined a comedy at the Testaccio theatre in Rome, and competed in the Miss Italia pageant in 1998, with the number 22 at the age of 17 wearing the belt of "Miss Cinema Lazio". She had her first TV role, although it would not influence the course of her career, by joining the cast of the 1999 edition of Scherzi a parte. As Blasi wanted to continue to work in TV, after two years spent participating in many castings, all with a negative response, she decided to make a last attempt. She applied to the casting for the pre-dinner quiz game of Canale 5 Passaparola hosted by Gerry Scotti and she was recruited for the 2001/2002 edition.

The fame

Regular presence on TV

Ilary Blasi finally began her real TV career on 10 September 2001, debuting in Passaparola as one of the six members of the dance troupe, called "Letterine" (which means "little letters" as the show is about word games). To complete the dancing cast there were the veterans Daniel Bello, Silvia Toffanin and Alessia Fabiani and the newly hired Alessia Ventura and Ludmilla Radtchenko. During the 2002/2003 edition Blasi was in her second season as a Letterina as was Alessia Ventura, and they were joined by Federica Villani, Cosmanna Ardillo, Francesca Lodo and Morena Salvino.

Once the experience as a Letterina was over in June 2003, moved to the channel "Rai2" to host the summer edition of the musical format "Top of the pop" together with Alvin, touring between the cities of Diamante, Cagliari and Tempio Pausania and presenting two shows per week (Saturday at 2pm and Thursday at 10:40 pm).

In September 2003 Blasi was beside Fabio Fazio in his new show Che tempo che fa (How's the weather), broadcast on "Rai3" until May 2004. In the show, on-air from Friday to Sunday, Blasi was committed to introducing the connection with the various correspondents, presenting the special guests in the studio and reading the weather forecast at the end of the episode. From January 2004, to celebrate 50 years of the Italian public broadcaster "Rai", Blasi made a little runway every Saturday wearing a dress used in TV shows that are considered to be milestones in the history of Rai.

On 8 March 2004, as part of the Italian women's day, she hosted a special episode of "Le Iene show", joining Luca Bizzarri and Paolo Kessisoglu (who normally host the show) together with Elisabetta Canalis and Kasia Smutniak.

From 18 September 2004, she came back to host again with Alvin, for the Italian edition of "Cd:Live" on Rai 2. Meanwhile, she continued her experience beside Fabio Fazio in the new season of "Che tempo che fa" on Rai3, till 9 April 2005. On that day she was interviewed live by Fazio and she admitted in public to being pregnant. At the 3rd month she let the audience know to expect the baby by the end of October and her boyfriend confirmed the news with a phone call while on air. Blasi was to be replaced by the Swedish show-girl Filippa Lagerback. Instead her last episode of "CD:Live" was broadcast on 4 June with her showing a curvier silhouette and she introduced the girl who would play her role: Giorgia Palmas.

In 2006 she was the co-host of 56th Sanremo Music Festival with Giorgio Panariello and Victoria Cabello.

Still, in 2006, she hosted the edition of Festivalbar with "Il Mago Forest" (Forest the magician alias Michele Foresta) and Cristina Chiabotto.

From 15 January 2007 she once again joined the duo of comedians "Luca e Paolo" (Bizzarri and Kessisoglu) to host "Le Iene" and at the end of the season, May 2007, she was at the end of her second pregnancy.

In September 2007 she hosted a show from the "Gialappa's band" with Forest "Mai dire candid". The show was on air during peak time before "Le Iene", broadcast at late night always with Blasi and "Luca e Paolo".

In September 2008 she was joined by Fabio De Luigi, who replaces Luca e Paolo for the autumn edition of "le Iene". In 2009 the duo went back with Blasi and they kept on hosting "Le Iene" until spring 2011. After the summer of 2011 Ilary hosted the show with actor Luca Argentero and comedian Enrico Brignano until November 2011. The 2012 edition started with Blasi and Brignano joined by the actor Alessandro Gassman during the first episodes, replaced then by the showman Pippo Baudo for only one special episode, and the actor Claudio Amendola till the end of the season.

Advertising

Her first role in an advertisement after joining Passaparola goes back to June 2002 and was made to promote the suntanning products of the "Bilboa" brand.

In October 2002 the fashion brand "Bon Bon" booked Blasi to be the model of the fall/winter catalogue, before repeating for the next collection spring/summer 2003.

In March 2003 she worked as a designer for the British brand Miss Criminal (second brand of the more popular Criminal), created her collection that would be presented on 23 April of the same year in Ravenna, and later even in Milan, Turin and Palermo.

At the end of March 2004, the lingerie brand Emmecì chose her as the model for the "Malandrina" collection and she appeared in the catalogue dressed only with bras, strings and thongs.

From 1 January 2005, the Vicenza-based jewel company Comete picked her to represent their collection, placing her beside her partner Francesco Totti, already brand ambassador of the company.

During 2007 she's modelling for the catalogue of eyewear Vogue, posing for both printed and web campaign.

Prior to the launch of the fall/winter 07/08 collection, Ilary becomes ambassador of the fitness clothing brand Eke.

From October 2007 till 2011 she is the testimonial of a series of commercials for the mobile networking company Vodafone, shot with her husband Francesco Totti and A.C. Milan midfielder Gennaro Gattuso, and later with the comedian Flavio Insinna, TV host Francesco Facchinetti, singer Cesare Cremonini and Luca&Paolo from '"Le Iene''.

From 2010 she is the testimonial of the jewelry chain Stroili oro, she inaugurate two flagship stores in Milan and Rome promoting the launch of the new silver and golden tattoos created by the company.

Personal life
Blasi married Francesco Totti, a professional footballer at the time, on 19 June 2005 at the Basilica of Santa Maria in Aracoeli. Their wedding was aired on television with the proceeds being donated to charity. They had their first child, Cristian, on 6 November 2005. Their second child, a daughter named Chanel, was born on 13 May 2007. The couple has often been referred to as the "Italian Beckhams" and their private lives are often speculated upon in Italian magazines and tabloids. On 10 March 2016, the couple had their third child, Isabel. On 11 July 2022, it was announced that Totti and Blasi had separated.
Ilary has been in a relationship with German Bastian Muller, following her separation from her ex-husband Francesco Totti

Filmography

As an actress

Other appearances

References

1981 births
Living people
Association footballers' wives and girlfriends
Italian showgirls
Italian television personalities
Italian child actresses
Mass media people from Rome